The men's 60 metres hurdles event  at the 1988 European Athletics Indoor Championships was held on 6 March.

Medalists

Results

Heats
First 2 from each heat (Q) and the next 4 fastest (q) qualified for the semifinals.

Semifinals
First 3 from each semifinal qualified directly (Q) for the final.

Final

References

60 metres hurdles at the European Athletics Indoor Championships
60